Hasan Hafizur Rahman (1932–1983) became the editor of the Daily Bangla right after the Bangladesh Liberation War in 1971. He also worked for the government as a high official and edited an account of the independence struggle called The Liberation War of Bangladesh, which was published in sixteen volumes. He was the author of thirteen books including eight collections of poetry and Adhunik Kobi O Kobita (Modern Poets and Poetry), a book of critical essays.

Awards
 Adamjee Literary Award (1967)
 Bangla Academy Literary Award (1971)
 Ekushey Padak (!984)

References

1932 births
1983 deaths
Bengali writers
Recipients of the Independence Day Award
Bangladeshi male writers
Recipients of the Adamjee Literary Award